Romeo's Heart is a studio album by British-Australian singer John Farnham. The album was released in Australia on 3 June 1996 and was Farnham's first studio album since the release of Then Again... in 1993.

This album peaked in the ARIA charts at No. 2 and was four times platinum. It won the "Best Adult Contemporary Album" at the ARIA Awards in 1996. This album produced five singles in total Including: (A Simple Life), (Hearts On Fire), (Don't Let It End), (All Kind Of People) and "Have a Little Faith (In Us)" which gained the most commercial success, reaching No. 3 in March.

Track listing
 "Have a Little Faith (In Us)" (R. Desalvo, A. Roman) – 5:08
 "Little Piece of My Heart" (C. Celli, A. Levin, J. Ponti) – 4:52
 "A Simple Life" (J. Lind, R. Page) – 3:58
 "All Kinds Of People" (E. Pressley, S. Crow, K. Gilbert) – 5:16
 "Romeo's Heart" (J. Kimball, R. Vanwarmer) – 4:18
 "Don't Let It End" (A. Hendra) – 4:41
 "Hearts On Fire" (T. Kimmel, S. Lynch) – 4:48
 "Hard Promises To Keep" (K. Rhodes) – 5:45
 "Over My Head" (R. Pleasance, A. Tanner) – 5:45
 "May You Never" (J. Martyn) – 3:50
 "Second Skin" (J. Farnham, R. Fraser, C. Lim) – 3:41

Personnel
Credited to:
John Farnham – vocals
Lindsay Field – vocals
Lisa Edwards – vocals
Joe Creighton – bass, vocals
Brett Garsed – guitars, vocals
Stuart Fraser – guitars
Angus Burchall – drums
Steve Williams – harmonica

Charts

Weekly charts

Year-end charts

Certifications

References 

1996 albums
ARIA Award-winning albums
John Farnham albums